Jacob Nettey (born 25 January 1976) is a retired Ghanaian football defender. He is currently the coach of Hearts of Oak reserve team.

Club career
Nettey played for Hearts of Oak from 1994 to 2002 and Heart of Lions from 2003 to 2005.

International career
He was part of the Ghanaian 2000 African Nations Cup team, who exited in the quarter-finals after losing to South Africa. He was the captain of the all conquering Accra Hearts of Oak team that won the 2000 African Champions League. He was also a member of the Ghanaian squad at the 1996 Summer Olympics.

Honours

Club 
Hearts of Oak

 Ghana Premier League: 1996–97, 1997–98, 1999, 2000, 2001, 2002
 Ghanaian FA Cup: 1995–96, 1999, 2000
 Ghana Super Cup: 1997, 1998

References

External links
 

1976 births
Living people
Ghanaian footballers
2000 African Cup of Nations players
Footballers at the 1996 Summer Olympics
Olympic footballers of Ghana
Ghana international footballers
Accra Hearts of Oak S.C. players
Heart of Lions F.C. players
Association football defenders